Kuwait competed at the 2022 World Aquatics Championships in Budapest, Hungary from 17 June to 3 July.

Diving

Kuwait entered four divers. Sulaiman Al-Sabe was replaced in the men's 1 metre springboard competition by Hasan Qali.

Men

Swimming

Kuwait entered three swimmers.

Men

Women

References

Nations at the 2022 World Aquatics Championships
2022 in Kuwaiti sport
Kuwait at the World Aquatics Championships